Fiona Elizabeth Fullerton (born 10 October 1956) is a British actress and singer, known for her role as Alice in the 1972 film Alice's Adventures in Wonderland and as Bond girl KGB spy Pola Ivanova in the 1985 James Bond film A View to a Kill.

Early life
Fullerton is the daughter of Bernard and Pamela (née Crook) Fullerton. An only child, Fullerton was born at Ungwan Sarki Kaduna in Kaduna State, Nigeria. She had lived with her parents in Singapore, Germany and the United States. After weekly ballet lessons, at the age of 9 she was accepted into Elmhurst Ballet School in Camberley, Surrey as a boarder.

Career
Fullerton made her film acting debut at the age of 12 in 1969 with a role in Run Wild, Run Free. Subsequent credits included: Nicholas and Alexandra (as Anastasia), Alice's Adventures in Wonderland (as Alice) at the age of 15, and The Human Factor.

On television, Fullerton was among the original cast members on the BBC hospital drama Angels in 1975. She later appeared in series such as The Charmer, Hold the Dream and To Be the Best. In 1982, she starred on the West End stage as Guinevere in the musical Camelot, alongside Richard Harris.

In 1985, she played the role of Pola Ivanova in the James Bond film A View to a Kill. In 1986 she appeared in the TV series Shaka Zulu.

Later years
Fullerton has her own property company, which buys and manages flats, mainly in London. She also writes a series of columns on property investing. She is also a brand ambassador for RatedPeople.com, a home improvement site.

In 2013, Fullerton was one of the celebrities in BBC TV's Strictly Come Dancing.

Personal life
Fullerton married actor Simon MacCorkindale in 1976 at the age of nineteen, but the marriage ended in divorce in 1981. She then spent thirteen years living and working in London. She met Neil Shackell and the couple married shortly after meeting in 1994, and now live in the Cotswolds with his son James and their daughter Lucy (born 1995).

Filmography

Run Wild, Run Free  (1969) as Diana
Nicholas and Alexandra  (1971) as Anastasia Romanov
Alice's Adventures in Wonderland  (1972) as Alice
Angels as Patricia Rutherford (TV) (13 episodes, 1975–1976)
Dick Barton: Special Agent as Virginia Marley (TV) (1 episode, 1979)
A Question of Faith  (1979)
The Human Factor  (1979) as Elizabeth
Gauguin the Savage  (1980) (TV) as Rachel
The Ibiza Connection  (1984) (TV) as Jane Veradi
A View to a Kill  (1985) as Pola Ivanova
Shaka Zulu (1986) (TV) as Elizabeth Farewell
Hold the Dream  (1986) (TV) as Sky Smith
The Grand Knockout Tournament (1987) TV special as Herself
The Charmer  (1987) TV mini-series as Clarice Mannors (6 episodes)
A Hazard of Hearts  (1987) (TV) as Lady Isabel Gillingham
A Taste for Death (1988) as Lady Barbara Berowne (6 episodes, 1988)
Hemingway  (1988) TV mini-series as Lady Duff Twysden
  (1990) as Catherine
A Ghost in Monte Carlo  (1990) (TV) as Lady Violet
Spymaker: The Secret Life of Ian Fleming  (1990) (TV) as Lady Caroline
The Bogie Man  (1992) (TV)
Sweating Bullets as Claire (episode: White hot, 1992)
To Be the Best  (1992) (TV) as Madelena
Diggity: A Home at Last (2001) as Felicia
Masterchef (2013) as herself
Strictly Come Dancing series 11 (2013) as herself (Voted out week 8 of a 13-week run)

Strictly Come Dancing

References

External links
 
 Official Fiona Fullerton Rated People Blog

1956 births
Living people
British film actresses
British television actresses
British real estate businesspeople
English businesspeople
20th-century British actresses
21st-century British actresses
People from Kaduna
British expatriates in Nigeria
People educated at the Elmhurst School for Dance